Canelo Álvarez vs. Alfonso Gómez was a super welterweight fight for the WBC World title. The fight took place in Staples Center, Los Angeles, California, United States on 17 September 2011 on the Floyd Mayweather Jr.-Victor Ortiz pay-per-view broadcast. The Mayweather-Ortiz fight took place at another location at the MGM Grand Garden Arena in Las Vegas, Nevada taking place on the Mexican Independence weekend. Fans at Staples Center were able to see the live feed from Las Vegas and also see Canelo Alvarez fight live that night, and the people in Las Vegas could see the live feed from the Canelo fight in the Staples Center.

National Anthem singers

Entrance performers
Following the showing of each of the main events on the night, fans in attendance will see two post-fight concerts performed by Los Tucanes de Tijuana and El Gran Silencio.

Background
After a successful defense against England's Ryan Rhodes in his hometown of Guadalajara, Jalisco, Alvarez had various options to who defend his world title against next. Former Contender Alfonso Gomez had recently stopped Calvin Green in two rounds, and sent out a challenge to the young champion soon after his victory at the Morongo Casino, Resort & Spa in California. His plan was to contend at Welterweight unless he could get a shot at Canelo.

Undercard

Preliminary card
 Light Welterweight bout:  Antonio Orozco vs.  Fernando Rodriguez	
Orozco defeated Rodrigruez by unanimous decision. (60-54 | 60-54 | 60-54)
 Welterweight bout:  Hugo Centeno Jr. vs.  Willie Walton	
Centeno Jr. defeated Walton by unanimous decision. (40-35 | 39-36 | 39-36 )
 Super Welterweight bout:  Ray Rivera vs.  Rudy Gonzalez
Rivera defeated Gonzalez by knockout at 1:26 of the first round.
 Featherweight bout:  Mikayl Arreola vs.  Juan Sandoval
Arreola defeated Sandoval by unanimous decision. (58-55 | 58-55 | 57-56)

Result
Alvarez kept his 154-pound title belt, stopping Gomez at 2:36 of the sixth round. Alvarez knocked down Gomez with a compact left hook late in the first round as more of a balance knockdown while the round was slow up to that point. Gomez rallied in the next few rounds and hung in with the hard-punching Alvarez, outworking and outlanding him by a large margin and giving him problems with his in-and-out movement, his jab, and combination punching.  Gomez looked to be winning from the 2nd round to the first half of the 5th round.  Alvarez seemingly was coming on in the second half of the fifth round, and he stopped Gomez near the end of the 6th, with a nasty uppercut stunning Gomez and a follow-up flurry forcing the stoppage. Gomez thought referee Wayne Hedgpeth stopped the fight too soon, with Alvarez raining blows on Gomez for about six seconds, but not many getting through his defense.  The general consensus (and HBO's take) was that the stoppage was very quick as well.

International broadcasting

References

Gomez
2011 in boxing
Boxing in Los Angeles
2011 in sports in California
Boxing on HBO
Golden Boy Promotions
September 2011 sports events in the United States